The 2018–19 SEHA League season was the eighth season of the SEHA (South East Handball Association) League and fifth under the sponsorship of the Russian oil and gas company Gazprom. Ten teams from seven countries (Belarus, Croatia, North Macedonia, Serbia, Slovakia, Bosnia and Herzegovina and Romania)  were participating in this year's competition.

Vardar were the defending champions. The SEHA League consists of two phases – the first one has 18 rounds in which all teams played one home and one away games against each other. Afterwards, the four best ranked clubs played on the Final Four tournament.

Final four tournament was held in Brest, Republic of Belarus, on 2nd and 3 April. RK Vardar defeated PPD Zagreb 26–23 in the final to win their fifth title.

Team information

Venues and locations

Personnel and kits
Following is the list of clubs competing in 2018–19 SEHA League, with their manager, team captain, kit manufacturer and shirt sponsor.

Coaching changes

Regular season

Standings

Results

Final Four 
The SEHA - Gazprom League Executive Committee had made the decision for the final four tournament to be held at the Universal Sports Complex Victoria in Brest, Republic of Belarus, on 2nd and 3 April. The first-placed team of the standings faced the fourth-placed team, and the second-placed team played against the third-placed team from the standings in the Final Four.

Bracket

Semifinals

Match for third place

Final

Top goalscorers

Awards
The all-star team was announced on 3 April 2019.

Goalkeeper: 
Right wing: 
Right back: 
Centre back: 
Left back: 
Left wing: 
Pivot: 
Best Defender: 
MVP of the Final four:

References

External links 
 Official website

SEHA League
2018–19 domestic handball leagues